Berenice was the daughter of Mariamne, daughter of Herod Agrippa, and Gaius Julius Archelaus Antiochus Epiphanes, son of Chelcias (maybe Hilkiya in Hebrew, who was a friend and an officer at the court). She was born sometime after 50 CE. After her parents had divorced, she lived with her mother in Alexandria.

Notes

50s births
1st-century Jews
1st-century women
Jews and Judaism in the Roman Empire
Herodian dynasty
Year of death unknown
Ancient Jewish women